Matthew Bullock was an African American who fled to Canada and became a cause célèbre in the early 1920s.

Matthew Bullock may also refer to:

 Matthew Bullock (banker)  (born 1949), Master of St Edmund's College, Cambridge and former banker 
 Matthew Bullock (footballer) (born 1980), English footballer
 Matthew W. Bullock (1881–1972), social leader, civil servant and leading African-American